Paula Brancati (born June 6, 1989) is a Canadian actress. She is known for her work on Canadian television, including roles on Being Erica,  Slasher, Dark Oracle, and most notably for playing Jane Vaughn on Degrassi: The Next Generation.

Early life 
Brancati was born in Thornhill, Ontario, Canada.  She attended the regional arts program at St. Elizabeth Catholic High School, and studied with the CharActors Theatre Troupe. She is of Italian descent.

Career 
Brancati has starred on numerous television series, most notably as Jane Vaughn on Degrassi: The Next Generation and Jenny Zalen on Being Erica.

Brancati is a co-founder of BrancSeater Productions and has produced seven films for the production company, including People Hold On.

Brancati has several theatre credits and has been nominated for two Dora Awards. In 2016, Brancati portrayed Miss Honey in Matilda the Musical in Toronto.

Filmography

Film

Television

Music videos

References

External links
 

1989 births
21st-century Canadian actresses
Actresses from Ontario
Canadian child actresses
Canadian film actresses
Canadian people of Italian descent
Canadian television actresses
Living people
People from Thornhill, Ontario